Bleed India with a Thousand Cuts is a military doctrine followed by the Pakistani military against India. It consists of waging covert war against India using insurgents at multiple locations. According to scholar Aparna Pande, this view was put forward in various studies by the Pakistani military, particularly in its Staff College, Quetta. Peter Chalk and Christine Fair cite the former director of the Inter-Services Intelligence (ISI) explicating the strategy.

In a 1965 speech to the UN Security Council, Zulfikar Ali Bhutto, former Prime Minister and former President of Pakistan, declared a thousand-year war against India. Reetika Sharma writes that Pakistani Army Chief General Zia-ul-Haq gave form to Bhutto's "thousand years war" with the 'bleeding India through a thousand cuts' doctrine using covert and low-intensity warfare with militancy and infiltration. This doctrine was first attempted during the Punjab insurgency and then in Kashmir insurgency using India's western border with Pakistan.

Origins

The origins of the strategic doctrine are attributed to Zulfikar Ali Bhutto, then a member of the military regime of the General Ayub Khan, who declared a thousand-year war against India during his speech to the United Nations Security Council in 1965. His plans for the 1971 war included severing the entire eastern India and making it a "permanent part" of East Pakistan, occupying Kashmir, and turning East Punjab into a separate 'Khalistan'. After the war ended with Pakistan's own dismemberment, he laid down the doctrine of continuing the conflict by "inflicting a thousand cuts" on India. According to The Pioneer Bhutto declared that Pakistan's success in its 'national' goal of destruction of India would only be possible by "delivering a thousand cuts on its body politic" and not through a direct conventional war. One of the purposes of the declaration was to divert public attention from internal problems facing Pakistan.

On 5 July 1977, Bhutto was deposed by his army chief General Zia-ul-Haq in a military coup before being controversially tried and executed.

Zia then assumed the office of President of Pakistan in 1978 and the thousand cut policy began taking shape. After the defeat of Pakistan in the Indo-Pakistani War of 1971, Pakistan was divided and Bangladesh was created. The war clarified that Kashmir could no longer be taken from India by a conventional war. Zia implemented Bhutto's "thousand years war" with 'Bleed India Through A Thousand Cuts' doctrine using covert and low intensity warfare with militancy and infiltration.

Punjab

Pakistan had been helping the Sikh secessionist movement in the Indian Punjab since the 1970s. Since the early 1980s Pakistan's intelligence agency ISI created a special Punjab cell in its headquarters to support the militant Sikh followers of Bhindranwale and supply them with arms and ammunitions. Terrorist training camps were set up in Pakistan at Lahore and Karachi to train the young Sikhs. Hamid Gul (who had led ISI) had stated about Punjab insurgency that "Keeping Punjab destabilized is equivalent to the Pakistan Army having an extra division at no cost to the taxpayers."

Kashmir

After the conclusion of the Soviet–Afghan War, the fighters of the Sunni Mujahideen and other Islamic militants had successfully removed the Soviet forces from Afghanistan. The military and civil government of Pakistan sought to utilize these militants in the Kashmir conflict against the Indian Armed Forces in accordance with the "thousand cuts" doctrine so as to "bleed India", using Pakistan's nuclear arsenal as a shield. In the 1980s cross-border terrorism started in the Kashmir region as armed and well-trained groups of terrorists were infiltrated into India through the border. Pakistan officially maintained that the terrorism in Kashmir was "freedom struggle" of Kashmiris and Pakistan only provided moral support to them. But this turned out to be inaccurate as Director-General of Inter-Services Intelligence (ISI) stated in the National Assembly of Pakistan that the ISI was sponsoring this support in Kashmir. Pakistan has used the jihadist militias to conduct an asymmetric warfare with India. The militant groups have been used not just as proxies, but predominantly as "weapons" against India for Pakistan's "Bleed India" campaign.

According to a general involved with the "bleed India" strategy of infiltrating jihadists into Kashmir:

In May 1998, India tested its nuclear weapons at Pokhran-II followed by Pakistani nuclear tests. The Infiltration of Pakistani soldiers disguised as Kashmiri militants into positions on the Indian side of the LOC, resulted in a geographically limited Kargil War, during which the Pakistani Foreign Secretary Shamshad Ahmed issued a veiled nuclear threat that, 'We will not hesitate to use any weapon in our arsenal to defend our territorial integrity.'

After the Kargil War in 1999, the Kargil Review Committee came out with a report which took reference to the concept of Pakistan bleeding India. In Chapter 12, "Could Kargil Have Been Avoided?", the report said that if the "Siachenisation" of Kargil had happened prior to the war, that if troops had been stationed there all year round along a wider area, it would have resulted in huge costs "and enabled Pakistan to bleed India".

On 13 December 2001 a terrorist attack occurred on the Indian Parliament (during which twelve people, including the five terrorists who attacked the building, were killed) and the Jammu and Kashmir Legislative Assembly on 1 October 2001. India claimed that the attacks were carried out by two Pakistan-based terror groups fighting Indian administered Kashmir, the Lashkar-e-Taiba and Jaish-e-Mohammad, both of whom India has said are backed by Pakistan's ISI a charge that Pakistan denied. The military buildup was initiated by India in response to the twin attacks leading to the 2001–02 India–Pakistan standoff between India and Pakistan. Troops were amassed on either side of the border and along the Line of Control (LoC) in the region of Kashmir. International media reported the possibility of a nuclear war between the two countries and the implications of the potential conflict on the American-led "Global War on Terrorism" in nearby Afghanistan. Tensions de-escalated following international diplomatic mediation which resulted in the October 2002 withdrawal of Indian and Pakistani troops from the international border.

In spite of grave provocations, the lack of military retaliation by India was seen as evidence of successful deterrence of India by Pakistan's nuclear capability. According to David A. Robinson the nuclear deterrence has encouraged certain Pakistani elements to further provoke India. He adds that an "asymmetric nuclear escalation posture" of Pakistan has deterred conventional military power of India and in turn has enabled Pakistan's "aggressive strategy of bleeding India by a thousand cuts with little fear of significant retaliation".

Present
Presently the Islamic fundamentalists in Bangladesh and Pakistan, through designated terrorist groups such as Harkat-ul-Jihad al-Islami (HuJI), have joined forces to carry out terrorist attacks on India. In 2015, a Pakistani High Commission staff who was an ISI agent in Bangladesh had to be withdrawn by Pakistan after his involvement in financing of terrorism activities and fake Indian currency note racket was reported by intelligence sources. He was involved in financing of terrorist organizations Hizb ut-Tahir, Ansarullah Bangla Team and Jamaat-e-Islami. In December 2015, another Pakistani diplomat, a second secretary in the High commission was withdrawn for links with Jama'atul Mujahideen Bangladesh. The Daily Star reported that arrest of Pakistani citizens in Bangladesh with fake Indian currency was a "common phenomenon". In Bangladesh, HuJI-B provides a safe zone for training as well as help in crossing the border into India.

According to Pakistani commentator Pervez Hoodbhoy, "Pakistan's 'thousand cuts' policy is in shambles". India was able to overcome its losses without weakening of its strength. The international community abhors jihad. Pakistan's continuation of its covert war called "Jihad in Kashmir" has caused loss of international support for Pakistan's Kashmir policy, with every jihadist attack reducing Pakistan's moral high ground. At the center of the FATF vote was Hafiz Saeed, an internationally designated Pakistani terrorist, who India blames for various attacks in Jammu and Kashmir.

In an interview in May 2016, Husain Haqqani, Pakistan's former ambassador to America, said:

See also
 Pakistan and state-sponsored terrorism
 India and state-sponsored terrorism
 India–Pakistan relations
 Cold Start (military doctrine)

References

Bibliography
 
 
 
 
 
 

Military doctrines of Pakistan
Military of India
India–Pakistan military relations